Bend of the Lane, also known as the Harlow Luther House, is a historic house in Swansea, Massachusetts.  The main block of this -story wood-frame house was built c. 1740, and is a well-preserved local example of vernacular Georgian styling.  A -story ell was added c. 1850, and a second ell, an old "half-house" (three-bay facade), was grafted onto the front c. 1930.  The house has been associated for many years with prominent local farmers, including its builder, Harlow Luther, and Victor Gardner, whose family settled Gardner's Neck.

The house was listed on the National Register of Historic Places in 1990.

See also
National Register of Historic Places listings in Bristol County, Massachusetts

References

Houses completed in 1740
Houses in Bristol County, Massachusetts
Swansea, Massachusetts
Houses on the National Register of Historic Places in Bristol County, Massachusetts
1740 establishments in Massachusetts